The Seth Boyden House is a historic house at 135 Oak Street in Foxborough, Massachusetts. It is also known as "OAKWUD", after 500-year-old oak tree that stands on the northeast side of the main house. The two story brick house is claimed to have been built as early as 1728, although stylistic architectural evidence suggests a later (c. 1780–90) date. The house is notable as the home of inventor Seth Boyden, who was cited as a significant influence by Thomas Alva Edison.

The house was listed on the National Register of Historic Places in 1983.

See also
National Register of Historic Places listings in Norfolk County, Massachusetts

References

Houses in Norfolk County, Massachusetts
Buildings and structures in Foxborough, Massachusetts
Houses on the National Register of Historic Places in Norfolk County, Massachusetts